Bremia is a genus of gall midges (insects in the family Cecidomyiidae). There are at least 20 described species in Bremia.

Species
These 21 species belong to the genus Bremia:

 Bremia actiosa Skuse, 1888 g
 Bremia agilis (Felt, 1920) c g
 Bremia americana (Felt, 1914) i c g
 Bremia bifurcata Kieffer, 1904 c g
 Bremia borealis Felt, 1914 i c g
 Bremia caricis (Felt, 1907) i c g
 Bremia ciliata Kieffer, 1904 c g
 Bremia cilipes (Winnertz, 1853) c g
 Bremia decorata (Loew, 1850) c g
 Bremia filicis Felt, 1907 i c g
 Bremia fitchii (Felt, 1912) i c g
 Bremia legrandi Harris, 1981 c g
 Bremia longicornis Kieffer, 1904 c g
 Bremia longipes (Kieffer, 1901) c g
 Bremia macrofilum Felt, 1919 c g
 Bremia mirifica Gagne, 1994 c g
 Bremia montana Felt, 1914 i c g
 Bremia obconica Grover, 1979 c g
 Bremia podophyllae Felt, 1907 i c g
 Bremia sylvestris Felt, 1920 i c g
 Bremia tristis Felt, 1914 i c g

Data sources: i = ITIS, c = Catalogue of Life, g = GBIF, b = Bugguide.net

References

Further reading

External links

 

Cecidomyiinae
Cecidomyiidae genera